Nita Patel (born 1965) is an Indian-American vaccinologist who leads vaccine development at Novavax. She oversaw the development of the Novavax COVID-19 vaccine.

Early life and education 
Patel was born in Sojitra, a farming village in Gujarat. When she was four years old her father contracted tuberculosis, and came close to death. This experience motivated Patel to become a physician and attempt to find a cure for tuberculosis.  She went on to earn a master's degree in microbiology at Sardar Patel University and a master's degree in biotechnology at Johns Hopkins University.

Research and career 
After graduating from Johns Hopkins, Patel moved to Gaithersburg, Maryland where she worked for MedImmune, a company that looked to create vaccinations for tuberculosis, respiratory syncytial virus and Lyme disease. She was the sixteenth member of the MedImmune team. Later the company eventually acquired by AstraZeneca.

In 2015, Patel left AstraZeneca to join Novavax, a biotechnology start-up in Maryland. Her research considers antibody discovery and vaccine development. She oversaw the development of the Novavax COVID-19 vaccine, and led an all-woman team. After Patel received the SARS-CoV-2 spike protein in February 2020, she designed and characterized over twenty variants of the protein. This involved identifying the locations where antibodies bind to the protein, and developing tests to check whether the spike is consistent between manufacturing plant. The vaccines developed by Patel and Novavax make use of recombinant DNA. In an interview with Science Magazine, Patel said that she had worked eighteen hour days to develop the vaccine, but didn't get tired. They were awarded a $1.6 billion contract to run clinical trials. In 2021, the vaccine was shown to be 89% effective in large trials in the United Kingdom.

Selected publications

Personal life 
Patel is married to an American biochemist.

References 

1965 births
Living people
American people of Indian descent
Vaccinologists
People from Gujarat
Johns Hopkins University alumni
21st-century American women scientists
Women biotechnologists
American biotechnologists